Fat Pizza is a 2003 Australian comedy film based on the Pizza television series, both of which were created, produced, written and starred in by Paul Fenech.

It was produced by Village Roadshow Pictures and SBS Independent (uncredited). It was filmed in the Canterbury-Bankstown region of Sydney, specifically Bass Hill and Chullora. Scenes were also filmed in the Hills District of Sydney, at Kellyville and Norwest Business Park. It was released by Roadshow Entertainment on 10 April 2003 and made $2,146,843 at the box office.

Plot
The film is set in Canterbury-Bankstown and opens with the protagonist, Pauly (Paul Fenech), claiming that the following events are all true and that real names are used.

Pauly arrives late at work to find his employer, Bobo (Johnny Boxer), has hired a new delivery driver, Davo (Jason Davis). Pauly explains to Davo that Bobo is crazy from being a forty-year-old virgin who lives with his mother, but is getting married the next day to a Vietnamese mail-order bride, Lin Chow Bang (Tuyen Le), who is sneaking into the country illegally. Pauly then shows Davo the "Former Employee Hall of Shame", which features Sahib (Desan Padayachee), who was forced out for being too polite and not tough enough. In retribution for being fired, Sahib and his friends opened their own pizzeria, Phat Pizza.

Later on, Pauly gets into a traffic accident with clown mascot Ronnie Mcdoggle (George Kapiniaris), whom Pauly mocks and assaults. Dozens more clown mascots surround Pauly, forcing him to single handedly fight them all off, after which the clowns decide to back down and Pauly flees the scene in his delivery car.

Meanwhile, Davo is late delivering a pizza to a house of bikies. While looking around the delivery address, he finds a drug lab producing homemade steroids and a large amount of marijuana. He is then discovered by the bikie gang who fight with and subdue Davo. The bikies are about to kill Davo as the lab catches light and explodes as a result of Davo dropping a joint during the fight. Davo and the bikies survive the explosion, but Davo is able to escape. Back at the Pizzeria, Davo meets fellow delivery driver Sleek the Elite (Paul Nakad), who tells him how he feigns romantic interest in unattractive women so he can meet and sleep with their attractive friends. Sleek then details how he has another delivery driver, Habib (Tahir Bilgic) secretly film his sexual encounters without the women's knowledge.

While Pauly is getting ready to go clubbing with the other delivery drivers, Sahib steals his employee uniform from his clothes line and uses it to sneak into the pizzeria and tamper with the phonelines, redirecting all incoming calls to steal their business. Upon leaving, he is spotted by a group of the clown mascots who mistake him for Pauly and beat him up. As a result of their tampering, Phat Pizza then receives a phone call from the bikie gang asking for their address. During the night out with the other delivery drivers, Sleek runs into Toula (Rebel Wilson), one of the girls he has been leading on. Toula and her friends drug Sleek and abduct him. Upon awaking, they tell Sleek that they are sick of men using them to date their attractive friends and rape him as an act of revenge.

Come the next day, Sleek is on his way to the wedding when he is attacked by a coalition of organised crime syndicates who have allied against Sleek because the mafia leaders' daughters were victims of Sleek and Habib's voyeurism. Scared for his life, Sleek calls Rocky for help, who rallies a Lebanese mob to come to Sleek's defence. However, Rocky discovers that his sister was one of the girls Sleek slept with and had Habib film, leading him to turn on Sleek and join the gangs in beating him up. Bobo, his bride and their guests discover at the wedding that the priest quadruple booked the church, causing the priest to hastily marry all of the couples. Pauly then declares in a cut-away that "At this point, all that was left to do was go and get pissed".

In the post-credit scenes, Sleek calls Bobo from the hospital to ask for workers compensation only to be fired. The bikie gang members then kill the Phat Pizza employees mistaking them for the staff of Fat Pizza.

Cast

Reception 
The film received a mostly positive response from critics. Adrian Martin, a PhD in Film Style, gave the film a 3 out of 5 rating, praising it for its strong, outrageous jokes, saying they elevate it above most Australian comedies. Martin also commended its energy, brash confidence and appeal to its target audience. Louise Keller of Urban Cinefile said that the film's offensive humour was "very funny" and praised it for being irreverent, high-energy and over-the-top.

Controversy 
The film was a source of controversy because of its use of vulgar humour, racial stereotypes and ethnic slurs (including choco, for non-white people). Some have argued that the portrayal of ethnic-minority characters in the film links vulgarity to ethnic identity and social class. The film is also accused of disingenuously passing off its representations of ethnic minorities as satire to excuse its harmful implications. As such, it is an example of self-stereotyping, like other Australian ethnic-minority lead comedies are.

A counterargument to this that has been raised is that the film gives representation to ethnic minorities, such as Lebanese and Vietnamese people, who were previously absent from Australian comedy  and that it is an example of ethnic minorities representing themselves and pushing against mainstream representations. Therefore, Fat Pizza—among other films—marks a shift in the representation of minorities in Australian media away from sensitive, serious portrayals towards market driven entertainment (Khorana, 2019). The favored reception of the film is argued to represent a large, youthful, ethnic-minority audience looking for an outlet against being minoritized in Australian media.

Paul Fenech stated in an interview "It's a very hard country for a lot of people to survive, and that's why people come to my shows, doesn't matter whether they are Greek or bogan."

Sequel
The television show for which the film was adapted from went on to be renewed for another two seasons, which aired in 2005 and 2007 on SBS. A crossover film between Fat Pizza and Housos – another television show created by Paul Fenech – was released on November 27, 2014. The Fat Pizza television show was revived for a sixth season in 2019 by Paul Fenech and premiered on 7mate, November, 2019.

Trivia 

 This was the last appearance of Sleek the Elite in the franchise until 2014's Fat Pizza vs. Housos.
The serial killer featured in the film is based on a reference to a famous Australian serial killer Ivan Milat.
 The scene in the Northern Territory with the baby and the dingo is a reference to Lindy Chamberlain and the Death of Azaria Chamberlain.
 Fat Pizza (2003) was the first film Rebel Wilson starred in.
The character David Cockerfield is a parody of real-life magician David Copperfield.

See also
List of Australian films
Pizza (TV series)
Fat Pizza vs. Housos
Pizza delivery in popular culture

References

External links
Fat Pizza at the Internet Movie Database
Fat Pizza: The Movie at the National Film and Sound Archive
Rotten Tomatoes Rating Page

2003 films
Australian adventure comedy films
2000s adventure comedy films
Fictional restaurants
Films set in restaurants
Films set in Sydney
Seafaring films
2003 comedy films
2000s English-language films